"Connection Lost" is the sixteenth episode of the sixth season of the American sitcom Modern Family, and the series' 136th episode overall. It originally aired on February 25, 2015. The episode was written by Steven Levitan & Megan Ganz, and directed by Steven Levitan.

In the episode, Claire waits for her flight back home while trying to get in touch with Haley after a fight they had. Not being able to reach her, she asks everyone where she might be and a series of events and revelations lead her to believe that Haley is pregnant with Andy's baby and the two of them ran away to Las Vegas and got married.

"Connection Lost" breaks away from Modern Family'''s formula by presenting the entire episode through Claire's laptop screen as she uses FaceTime, iMessage and other social networking services to keep in touch with her family. The episode received positive reviews from the critics, with many praising the original concept and humor.

The episode won the Emmy Award for Outstanding Sound Mixing for a Comedy or Drama Series (Half-Hour) and Animation at the 2015 ceremony.

Plot
While waiting for her flight at O'Hare airport, returning from a presentation she had for a new client, Claire (Julie Bowen) attempts to get in touch with Haley (Sarah Hyland) after a big fight that they had. She uses FaceTime to contact Phil (Ty Burrell), who tells her that he thinks Haley slept over at a friend's house. Meanwhile, Alex (Ariel Winter) continuously sends Claire new versions of her college essay for her to proof read, but Claire ignores them.

While talking to Jay (Ed O'Neill), Claire gets a notification from Facebook that it also happens to be Mitchell's (Jesse Tyler Ferguson) birthday, so she FaceTimes him to wish him a happy birthday. Knowing from Alex that Haley was baby sitting Lily (Aubrey Anderson-Emmons) the previous night, she asks Cameron (Eric Stonestreet) and Mitchell if they know where Haley is and they reveal that the last time they saw her was when she borrowed one of Mitchell's old blue suits. Lily tells her that Dylan (Reid Ewing) was there the previous night talking with Haley, something that surprises her since she was unaware that the two of them were still in touch.

Claire uses her fake Facebook profile to view Haley's Facebook page and sees that Haley has changed her relationship status to "Married". Claire starts to panic while Phil tries to calm her down, but putting the clues together (borrowed old blue suit and being with Dylan) makes her believe that Haley married Dylan. She calls him but after talking to him, she knows that Dylan was to her relief, not the groom. Having no other way to find her, Claire hacks into Haley's iCloud account to track the GPS on her phone, much to Alex's disapproval. Claire searches the address on Google Maps which shows up on a street in Las Vegas, next to a small wedding chapel. Claire panics even more and tries to think about whom Haley would end up married to, but she has no details about who Haley is dating.

While talking to everyone; Mitchell, Cameron, Alex, Phil, Jay, Gloria (Sofía Vergara), Luke (Nolan Gould) and Manny (Rico Rodriguez), who reveal that Andy (Adam DeVine) has taken time off to go to Vegas for a wedding, Claire comes to the conclusion that Haley has married Andy without telling anyone. A parcel then arrives for Haley at the Dunphy household, which Phil opens. The parcel is revealed to be the book What to Expect When You're Expecting. Claire panics once again that Haley might be pregnant and after her last attempts to get in contact with her or Andy, she closes all of her FaceTime windows to open a slideshow of Haley's childhood pictures, eats Cameron's popcorn, and cries while watching it.

Feeling incredibly stressed by the situation, Claire FaceTimes her Dad, seeking his wisdom and to apologize for doing the same thing as Haley when she was her age. Jay reassures her that Haley being pregnant and married might not necessarily be a bad thing since when she did it years ago led her to have a loving family with a good husband. Jay says this without knowing Phil, who is now crying, is also listening and Jay tries to take back everything he said.

Claire finally receives an incoming call from Haley, who has just woken up. It turns out that Haley was in the Dunphy's household asleep the whole time and is neither pregnant nor married; the suit was to lend to her friend who was getting married, her phone was accidentally left in Andy's car when he went on his trip to Vegas, her Facebook status was a joke about a "Cronut," and the pregnancy book was to help her design clothes for her boss's new fashion range. The family expresses their relief over the situation as Claire, when Haley immediately questions how her mother got onto her Facebook page and found out where her phone was, pretends to lose connection and log out of the FaceTime call, before leaving for her flight.

Production
The original idea for the episode came from the producer of the show, Steven Levitan, while he was talking to one of his college-aged daughters on FaceTime. The episode was also inspired in part by the 2013 short film Noah, which told the story of a teenager's breakup with his girlfriend entirely through the character's computer screen.

The whole episode was filmed with Apple products and the post production took longer than usual, as editors and motion graphics producers had to merge the videos with visual effects to create the look of a computer screen that features as many as nine open windows.

Originally, the whole episode was shot with crew members, just as a proof of concept. During the shootings, the actors were supposed to hold the recording devices by themselves; however, to avoid recording the ceiling or other items that were not useful to the episode, the cameramen were holding the devices while the actors placed their hands next to the cameramen's hands so that it looked like a selfie.

Reception

Ratings
In its original American broadcast, "Connection Lost" was watched by 9.32 million; up by 0.52 from the previous episode. 

Reviews
"Connection Lost" received positive reviews from television critics, with many praising the episode's originality, writing and humor even though some of them stated that it looked like an advertisement for Apple. 

Sandra Gonzalez of Mashable praised the episode's concept. "...In addition to the pure fun of the laptop-only framing device, it was used incredibly cleverly". Gonzalez also praised the writing by stating "Bonus points to the writers for the great attention to detail. Almost everything about Claire's digital world seemed fleshed out, down to the previous communications with her children".

Gwen Ihnat of The A.V. Club awarded the episode a B, and labelled the episode as "A gimmicky but successful storytelling experiment" and "one of the most entertaining episodes in recent memory". Ihnat closed her review by stating "the technology did pull all of Modern Family together this episode, with primarily successful results".

Ashley Bissette Sumerel of TV Fanatic rated the episode with 4.8/5 saying that it was one of the most brilliant episodes we had seen in a while. "This week's Modern Family tries something very experimental, and the results are fantastic!. [...] Overall, "Connection Lost" is another hilarious episode of Modern Family, but it's also very well done".

Anick Jesdanun of The Detroit News gave a positive review to the episode saying that "The digital medium offered a fresh, clever way of storytelling — with jokes and plot twists not possible with the documentary-style approach that "Modern Family" typically uses". Jesdanun closed their review by claiming "The graphics were so realistic that I reached for my mouse once or twice to try to move a window — before remembering I was watching TV on my computer. I caught a lot more on repeat viewings".

Bryan Bishop of The Verge also gave a positive review to the episode saying that it worked even if it felt like a half-hour Apple commercial. "...[the episode] takes place entirely on the screen of a character’s laptop — and while it’s a fun new riff on the sitcom's successful formula, it’s also one of the most glowing love letters to the Mac you'll see this side of an Apple keynote."

Despite the positive reviews, Lisa Fernandes of Next Projection'' rated the episode with 6.5/10 saying that the episode could have been a lot worse but it could have been a lot better. "Bereft of the hope of actually telling interesting stories, Modern Family’s resorted to a gimmick episode- an entire story told via webcams, cell phones, mini-cams, Ipad homepages and other Netbook devices. What’s supposed to be a quirky and fun frankly feels strange and unwieldy."

References

External links

"Connection Lost" at ABC.com

2015 American television episodes
Modern Family (season 6) episodes
Screenlife films
Television episodes about social media